Born to Be Bad is a 1950 American film noir melodrama directed by Nicholas Ray and starring Joan Fontaine, Robert Ryan and Zachary Scott. It features Fontaine  as a manipulative young woman who will stop at nothing to get what she wants. It is based on the bestselling novel All Kneeling by Anne Parrish (1928).

Plot
Donna Foster works for publisher John Caine. She agrees to have his niece, Christabel, live with her in San Francisco while Christabel attends business school.

Christabel proves to be a scheming, socially ambitious tramp. She flirts with Donna's fiance, the wealthy Curtis Carey, at a party for Donna's friend, painter Gabriel Broome. She also attracts the interest of aspiring author Nick Bradley.

While having her portrait done by Broome, a call from Curtis brings her eagerly to a jeweler, only to discover to her disappointment that he merely seeks her advice in buying Donna an engagement gift. After he purchases an expensive one, Christabel plants a seed of doubt in Donna's mind and makes her feel guilty by insinuating that in accepting such a lavish gift, Donna is giving Curtis the appearance of being after his money.
 
Christabel then turns around and cunningly does the same to Curtis by convincing him to propose a pre-nuptial agreement. Donna is offended and the couple break up, which turns out to have been Christabel's plan all along. With Curtis now available, Christabel rebuffs a marriage proposal from Nick, whose novel is about to be published by Caine.

A romance develops that leads to Christabel's marrying Curtis and becoming a high society lady. However, it turns out that she is still attracted to Nick, whom she begins seeing on the side. On one occasion, she slips away from a vacation resort, telling Curtis that she is going to see her aunt Clara. Her lie is exposed by Caine, her uncle, who informs Curtis that the aunt had died while Christabel claimed to be visiting her.

Curtis reunites with Donna after sending away Christabel with nothing more than a few expensive furs.

Cast
 Joan Fontaine as Christabel Caine Carey
 Robert Ryan as Nick Bradley
 Zachary Scott as Curtis Carey
 Joan Leslie as Donna Foster
 Mel Ferrer as Gabriel 'Gobby' Broome
 Harold Vermilyea as John Caine
 Virginia Farmer as Aunt Clara Caine
 Kathleen Howard as Mrs. Bolton
 Bess Flowers as Mrs. Worthington

Reception
Film critic Dennis Schwartz gave the film a mixed review, writing, "Nicholas Ray (Rebel Without A Cause/Johnny Guitar) dips down a few levels from his illustrious opus to helm this trashy but stylishly entertaining melodrama. It's passable as a routine Hollywood woman's pic about bitchy social climber Christabel Caine (Joan Fontaine) ... Ray keeps all the viciousness going at full blast, thereby drawing an ugly picture about the bankrupt emotional state of society life."

Film critic Craig Butler in his film review suggests suspending disbelief when watching the film, writing, "Although it's hardly a great movie, Born to Be Bad is a lot of fun – if one is in the mood for a bitchy, campy, over-the-top melodrama."

In popular culture
In 1973, the thirteenth episode of the seventh season of The Carol Burnett Show featured a take-off of the film called "Raised to Be Rotten", with Carol Burnett as "Christinabel", Ruth Buzzi as "Darlene", Richard Crenna as "Buck" and Harvey Korman as "Kirk".

References

External links

 
 
 
 
 Born to Be Bad information site and DVD review at DVD Beaver (includes images)
 

1950 films
1950 drama films
American black-and-white films
Films based on American novels
Films directed by Nicholas Ray
Films scored by Friedrich Hollaender
Films set in San Francisco
Film noir
RKO Pictures films
American drama films
Melodrama films
1950s English-language films
1950s American films